The Tajik Soviet Socialist Republic, also commonly known as Soviet Tajikistan, the Tajik SSR, or simply Tajikistan, was one of the constituent republics of the Soviet Union which existed from 1929 to 1991 located in Central Asia.

The Tajik Republic was created on 5 December 1929 as a national entity for the Tajik people within the Soviet Union. It succeeded the Tajik Autonomous Soviet Socialist Republic (Tajik SSR), which had been created on 14 October 1924 as a part of the predominantly Turkic Uzbek SSR in the process of national delimitation in Soviet Central Asia.  On 24 August 1990, the Tajik SSR declared sovereignty in its borders. The republic was renamed the Republic of Tajikistan on 31 August 1991 and declared its independence from the disintegrating Soviet Union on 9 September 1991; thus modern Tajikistan is its direct legal successor state.

Nomenclature 
The name Tajik refers to the name of a pre-Islamic tribe that existed before the seventh century A.D. Based on the Library of Congress's 1997 Country Study of Tajikistan, it is difficult to definitively state the origins of the word "Tajik" citing due to its "embroiled in twentieth-century political disputes about whether Turkic or Iranian peoples were the original inhabitants of Central Asia."

The name of the country was often spelt "Tadzhikistan" in the English language during Soviet times due to it being borrowed directly from the Russian spelling "Таджикистан", where the letters 'дж' produce a 'j' sound.

History 

One of the new states created in the process of national delimitation of Soviet Central Asia in October 1924 was the Uzbek Soviet Socialist Republic – Uzbek SSR or Soviet Uzbekistan.  Soviet Tajikistan was created at the same time within the predominantly Turkic Uzbek SSR as an Autonomous Soviet Socialist Republic (Tajik ASSR) – one rank below a Soviet Socialist Republic in USSR geopolitical hierarchy.  The new autonomous republic included what had been eastern Bukhara and had a population of about 740,000, out of a total population of nearly 5 million in the Uzbek Soviet Socialist Republic as a whole. Its capital was established in Dyushambe, which had been a village of 3,000 in 1920.  In December 1929, Tajik ASSR was detached from the Uzbek SSR and given full status as a Soviet Socialist Republic –  Tajik Socialist Soviet Republic.  At that time, its capital was renamed Stalinabad, after Joseph Stalin, and the territory that is now northern Tajikistan (Sughd Province) was added to the new republic.  Even with the additional territory, the Tajik SSR remained the smallest Central Asian republic. On 5 December 1936, it was renamed the Tajik Soviet Socialist Republic.

With the creation of a Tajik republic defined in national terms came the creation of institutions that, at least in form, were likewise national.  The first Tajik-language newspaper in Soviet Tajikistan began publication in 1926.  New educational institutions also began operation at about the same time.  The first state schools, available to both children and adults and designed to provide basic education, opened in 1926.  The central government also trained a small number of Tajiks for public office, either by putting them through courses offered by government departments or by sending them to schools in the Uzbek SSR.

Under Soviet rule, Tajikistan experienced some economic and social progress. However, living standards in the republic were still among the lowest in the Union. Most people still lived in rural qishlaqs, settlements that were composed of 200 to 700 one-family houses built along a waterway.

After Stalin's death in March 1953, Stalinabad was renamed Dushanbe on 10 November 1961 as part of the De-Stalinization program.

In February 1990, riots occurred in the republic's capital Dushanbe. 26 people died and 565 more were injured and the Soviet troops put down the riots. Yaqub Salimov, a future Interior Minister, and some youth activists were convicted for participation in the riots.

Later on 24 August 1990, Tajik SSR declared its sovereignty over Soviet laws. By 1991, Tajikistan participated in a referendum in March as part of the attempt to preserve the union with a turnout of 96.85%. However, this did not happen when hardliners took control of Moscow during the next three days in August. After the failure of the coup, the Tajik SSR was renamed the Republic of Tajikistan on 31 August 1991. On 9 September 1991, Tajikistan seceded from the Soviet Union months before the country itself ceased to exist on 26 December 1991. Conflicts after independence caused a civil war throughout the country over the next six years.

Politics

Tajikistan, like all other republics in the Soviet Union, was officially a Soviet republic governed by the Tajik republican branch within the Communist Party of the Soviet Union in all organs of government, politics and society. The Supreme Soviet was a unicameral legislature of the republic headed by a Chairman, with its superiority to both the executive and judicial branches and its members convened in the Supreme Soviet building in Dushanbe. Since independence in 1991, it retained the unicameral structure before being replaced by a bicameral system in 1999 using the presidential system. The republic's government structure was similar to those of other republics.

Military

Tajikistan was the only Central Asian Republic to not form an army under the Soviet Armed Forces. In replacement were the Soviet units under the Ministry of Defence, as well as troops who were subordinates of the Turkestan Military District and the Central Asian Military District in neighboring Uzbekistan and Kazakhstan respectively. In the early 1990s the army was the smallest in the union and had more Russians than native Tajiks in it. The army failed to effectively defend the regime as proven in the 1990 Dushanbe riots. There was a large contingent of Soviet border guards who were commanded by Russians based from Moscow who commanded ethnic Tajik conscripts. When the TurkVO was dissolved in June 1992, its personnel were distributed between Tajikistan and the other 4 Central Asian republics.

The Tajik SSR also operated its own Ministry of Internal Affairs and Internal Troops, which was an independent republican affiliate of the Ministry of Internal Affairs of the Soviet Union.

Economy

Like all other republics in the Soviet Union, its economy was highly centralised. After independence, it has its Transition economy.

Industry
Light industry and food industries accounted for over 60% of industrial output. The main branches of heavy industry were electric power, mining, non-ferrous metallurgy, machine building, metalworking, and building materials industry. The basis of the electricity accounted for HPP. Mining activities concentrate on brown coal, oil and natural gas. Non-ferrous metals industries were an aluminum plant in Tursunzade and hydrometallurgical in Isfara. Engineering enterprises produced winding, agricultural machinery, equipment for trading enterprises and public catering, textile, lighting and wiring equipment, transformers, household refrigerators, cable and other (main center - Dushanbe). The chemical industry included plants - nitrogen fertilizer in Kurgan-Tube, electrochemical in Yavan, and plastics in Dushanbe. The main branches of light industry were cotton ginning, silk, and carpet weaving. In the food industry stood fruit-canning, vegetable oil and fat industry.

Agriculture
In 1986, there were 299 state and 157 collective farms in the country. Agricultural land was 4.2 million hectares.

Due to the large irrigation works in the area of irrigated land 1986 have reached 662 thousand hectares. Agriculture gave about 65% of gross agricultural output. The leading branch of agriculture was cotton (cotton collection 922 thousand tons in 1986), developed in Fergana, Vakhsh, Hissar valleys. Tajikistan was the main base of the country for the production of long-staple cotton. Cultured and tobacco, geranium, linen - Kudryashov, sesame. Approximately 20% of crops were occupied by grain crops (gross grain harvest - 246 thousand tons in 1986 in.). They grow vegetables and melons. Was developed fruit (including citrus fruit) and grapes. Meat and wool sheep and meat and dairy cattle. Livestock (in 1987, in millions): cattle - 1.4 (including cows - 0.6), sheep and goats - 3.2. Sericulture.

Transportation

Operating length (in 1986):
 Railways – 470 km
 Roads – 13,200 km (including paved – 11,600 km.)
 Airports

Tajikistan is supplied with gas from Uzbekistan and Afghanistan with gas pipelines from Kelif to Dushanbe, from local gas fields.

Notes

References

 Tajikistan at the Library of Congress Country Studies
  History of Tajik SSR, edited by B. A. Antonenko, Maorif Publ. House, Dushanbe, 1983.

External links 
Tajikistan, land of sunshine by Nazarsho Dodkhudoev

 
Former socialist republics
Republics of the Soviet Union
States and territories established in 1929
1929 establishments in the Soviet Union
1991 disestablishments in the Soviet Union
States and territories disestablished in 1991